Babayacha is a village in Ajmer tehsil of Ajmer district of Rajasthan state in India.The village falls under Babayacha gram panchayat.

Demography
As per 2011 census of India, Babayacha has population of 4,425 of which 2,303 are males and 2,122 are females. Sex ratio of the village is 921.

Transportation
Babayacha is connected by air (Kishangarh Airport), by train (Ajmer Junction railway station) and by road.

See also
Ajmer Tehsil
Aradka, Ajmer

References

Villages in Ajmer district